The Fabulous Sound of Lester Flatt & Earl Scruggs is a studio album by bluegrass artists Flatt and Scruggs. It was released in 1964 by Columbia Records (catalog number CL 2255).

The album debuted on Billboard magazine's Top Country Albums chart on January 2, 1965, peaked at No. 2, and remained on the chart for a total of 26 weeks.

Track listing
Side A
 "Hello Stranger" (A.P. Carter) [2:14]
 "Amber Tresses Tied in Blue" (A.P. Carter) [2:43]
 "The Good Things (Out-Weigh the Bad)" (Jake Lambert, Josh Graves) [3:25]
 "Bummin' an Old Freight Train" (Flatt, Scruggs) [2:38]
 "I'm Walking with Him" (Flatt, Scruggs) [2:11]
 "The Train that Carried My Girl from Town" (Doc Watson) [2:19]

Side B
 "My Wandering Boy" (Flatt, Scruggs) [2:35]
 "Georgia Buck" (Flatt, Scruggs) [2:50]
 "Father's Table Grace" (Henry, Flatt, Scruggs) [2:21]
 "When Papa Played The Dobro" (Johnny Cash) [1:59]
 "Please Don't Wake Me" (Flatt, Scruggs) [3:01]
 "A Faded Red Ribbon" (Bassham) [2:31]

Credits
The musicians performing on the album are:
 Lester Flatt - guitar, vocals
 Earl Scruggs - banjo, guitar, vocals
 Jody Rainwater - bass, mandolin
 Curly Seckler - mandolin, vocals
 Jim Shumate - fiddle
 Howard Watts - bass
 Mac Wiseman - guitar, vocals
 Art Wooten - fiddle

References

1964 albums
Lester Flatt albums
Earl Scruggs albums
Columbia Records albums